John Benjamin Gough (August 29, 1900 – January 19, 1935) was an American football player and coach. He served as the head football coach at Redlands University from 1931 to 1932 compiling a record of 11–5–1.

Gough graudared from Upper Iowa University in Fayette, Iowa. He died on January 19, 1935, at San Antonio Community Hospital in Upland, California, from injuries sustained in an automobile accident two weeks prior near Ontario, California.

Head coaching record

College

References

External links
 

1900 births
1935 deaths
Redlands Bulldogs football coaches
High school football coaches in California
High school football coaches in Iowa
Upper Iowa University alumni
People from Butler County, Iowa
Players of American football from Iowa
Road incident deaths in California